Solid Gold is an American syndicated music television series that debuted on September 13, 1980, and ran until July 23, 1988. The program was a production of Brad Lachman Productions in association with Operation Prime Time and Paramount Domestic Television.

Usually airing on Saturday evenings, Solid Gold was one of several shows that focused on the popular music of any given week; other examples included the long-running American Bandstand and Soul Train. While Solid Gold did share elements with those two programs, such as appearances by performers, it also stood out by including something they did not: an in-house crew of professional dancers that performed routines choreographed to the week's featured songs.

Reviews of the show were not always positive, with The New York Times referring to it as "the pop music show that is its own parody...[enacting] mini-dramas...of covetousness, lust and aerobic toning—routines that typically have a minimal connection with the songs that back them up."

Production background
Solid Gold was created by Al Masini as part of his Operation Prime Time production unit, and was developed by Bob Banner. It was produced by Brad Lachman Productions for all eight of its seasons and Bob Banner Associates for its first four, after which Banner's company began producing Star Search for Television Program Enterprises, Masini's other production company.

Solid Gold was packaged by Operation Prime Time (which was a co-venture of Masini and Universal Pictures through its MCA Television unit) and Paramount Television, and was distributed by the remains of Paramount Television Service for its first two seasons. Paramount's syndication unit took over distributorship for the remaining six seasons. Operation Prime Time continued to produce Solid Gold until Masini elected to merge it with Television Program Enterprises in 1987 (TPE did not, however, share in any distribution or packaging as Paramount assumed that themselves).

From its debut in 1980 until the end of its fourth season, the show was taped at the Golden West Broadcasters studio facility. Beginning in September 1984, Paramount, who had previously owned the Golden West facility in the early days of television, moved production of Solid Gold to its studios with a redesigned set.

At the start of Solid Gold's first season (1980), Michael Miller was chosen by its first host, Dionne Warwick, to be the show's musical director. Miller stayed on for the entire series and composed the theme song for Solid Gold with Academy Award-winning songwriter Dean Pitchford providing the lyrics. The song, re-recorded various times to reflect current music trends, was performed by the show's hosts (with the exception of the 1984–85 season, which was performed by session singer, Deborah Ludwig Davis) at the beginning and end of each program, with the closing theme accompanied by a final routine from the Dancers.

History and format overview

Year-end Top 40 countdown shows
The first episode of the show in January 1980 would become a yearly tradition, as they counted down the Top 50 songs of 1979 in a two-hour television pilot special, called Solid Gold '79, hosted by Dionne Warwick and Glen Campbell. The year end countdown would be reduced to forty songs beginning in 1981 and would be presented every year through 1986.

Source material
The data featured by Solid Gold came from the weekly pop music chart compiled Radio & Records, a music industry trade newspaper that was responsible for providing data to various chart tracking programs for over 30 years. The difference between the R&R chart and those used by competitors like America's Top 10, which was hosted by Casey Kasem and also launched in 1980, was that only radio airplay was tracked. Kasem's program, which later adopted the Radio & Records chart as its source, and several others (including Kasem's radio counterpart, American Top 40) used the Billboard Hot 100, which also tracked record sales.

Daily spinoff
In the summer of 1984, the producers of Solid Gold added a daily 30-minute series called Solid Gold Hits to the weekend program. Actor Grant Goodeve presided over a general grouping of the week's hit songs, and a second roster of Solid Gold Dancers was employed for this series; regular Solid Gold Dancer Deborah Jenssen was the principal dancer of this roster. Additional Solid Gold Hits Dancers were Pam Rossi, Cooley Jackson, Raymond Del Barrio, Macarena Gandarillas, Flo Lyle, Debra Johnson, Tricia McFarlane, Wanja Mcyntire and Corky Cortez (appearing with Cooley in the opening dance numbers).

Performers/personalities

Hosts and announcers
Dionne Warwick hosted the first season of Solid Gold, aided by comedian Marty Cohen, with veteran Los Angeles DJ Robert W. Morgan announcing. Dionne Warwick was fired in 1981. After Warwick left the series, singers Andy Gibb and Marilyn McCoo were brought in as co-hosts and puppeteer Wayland Flowers joined the series as a secondary comedic act with his puppet Madame. Gibb left Solid Gold in 1982 and Rex Smith replaced him, but he too would leave after one season. Following a season where McCoo hosted by herself, she left in 1984 and Rick Dees of the Weekly Top 40 radio show was hired. Arsenio Hall joined the series during this time as the in-house comedian in place of Marty Cohen. At the midway point of the 1984–85 season, Dees left Solid Gold and a series of guests were used in the interim. Original host Dionne Warwick returned toward the end of the 1984–85 season and stayed on through the following season, finally leaving the program for good in 1986.

When Solid Gold returned for its seventh season in September 1986, several changes were made. Marilyn McCoo returned to the series after a two-year absence. Arsenio Hall was promoted from his role as in-house comedian to co-host, with Jeff Altman replacing him, and the series added an additional co-host with Nina Blackwood, one of the original MTV VJs who was a correspondent for Entertainment Tonight at the time, joining the cast. The title of the series added the current year to it and American Bandstand announcer Charlie O'Donnell replaced Robert W. Morgan in that role.  Chuck Riley was the announcer for that season's first episode with O'Donnell announcing the remainder of the season. The season was also referred to as "Solid Gold '87."

Solid Gold was overhauled again in 1987, with the series putting more of an emphasis on live performances and changing its name to Solid Gold in Concert. McCoo, Hall, and Blackwood stayed on as hosts with Dick Tufeld replacing Charlie O'Donnell as announcer after O'Donnell decided to remain with American Bandstand as it left its longtime home at ABC to join Solid Gold in syndication.

Linda Greene of the Peaches and Herb duo ("Reunited" and "Shake Your Groove Thing" hits) was also offered the hosting duties according to the January 2015 TV One Unsung broadcast.

The Solid Gold Dancers
The weekly one-hour show played segments from the Top 10 charting songs accompanied by the Solid Gold Dancers. Of the eight original Solid Gold '79 dancers, only four would join the Solid Gold series cast: Darcel Wynne (1980–1984 & 1985–1986), who would be the program's principal dancer for its first five years and was often credited by her first name alone, Paula Beyers (1980–1982), Deborah Jenssen (1980–1984), Tony Fields (1980–1984) and Alexander Cole (1980–1983). Gayle Crofoot (1982–1985) would join the roster in late fall of 1982, replacing dancer Lucinda Dickey (1982). The other remaining "Solid Gold '79" dancers were Larry Blum, Candy Brown and Judy Pierce. Cooley Jackson/Jaxson (1983–1986) joined the show in 1983, replacing Alexander Cole. Cooley also was the White Ranger in the Power Rangers Live Tour, Breakin' the Movie, and Electric Boogaloo Breakin' 2. Other dancers who appeared on Solid Gold were: Pam Rossi (1980–1986), Helene Phillips (1980–1982), Laura Melton (1980), Michael Perea (1980), Kahea Bright (1980–1984), Janeen Best (1982–1983 & 1985), Macarena Gandarillas (1982), Tricia McFarlane (1983), Jamilah Lucas (1983 & 1984–1988), Chelsea Field (1983–1984), Kelly Stubbs (1983), Lezlie Mogell (1984–1985), Steve La Chance (1984), Mark Sellers (1984–1986), Arlene Ng (1984), Beverly Jeanne (1984–1986), Nicole Romine (1984–1986), Eileen Fairbanks (1985–1987), Leslie Cook (1986–1988), Gigi Hunter (1986–1988), Audrey Baranishyn (1986–1987), Darrell Wright (1986–1988), Paul Michael Thorpe (1986–1988), Regan Patno (1986–1988), Andrea Moen (1987–1988), and Betsy Harris (1987–1988).

Some of the dancers moved on to acting careers, including Dickey (Ninja III: The Domination, Breakin' ) and the late Tony Fields in the 1986 horror movie Trick or Treat (as dead rock icon Sammi Curr) and in the 1988 movie musical Dance Academy along with Steve La Chance.  Another example is Chelsea Field, whose movie credits include Commando (as an airline stewardess), Masters of the Universe (she was Teela), and The Last Boy Scout (as Bruce Willis's philandering ex-wife).

Darcel appeared on the show from 1980 to 1984, but she took most of the 1984–85 season off to work with a traveling ministry and Jamilah Lucas was appointed principal dancer. Darcel rejoined the roster for the 1985–86 season, reclaiming her position from Jamilah, who remained in the regular lineup. During that season, she became a de facto co-host as she took on a more active voice role in the series, regularly announcing the countdown re-caps toward the end of each program. The 1986 season was Darcel's last as a member of the cast as she and many of the dancers, including some of the originals, left. Jamilah was once again appointed to lead dancer for the remainder of the series.

The last appearance of the Solid Gold Dancers in media was not on Solid Gold itself, but rather in the 1988 motion picture Scrooged. The movie, which premiered in November 1988, was scripted and filmed before Solid Gold was officially cancelled.

In 2011, Darcel Wynne, Deborah Jenssen, and Lezlie Mogell were competitors on the reality competition series  Live to Dance. They managed to advance past the audition stage but did not advance further.

The choreographers who plotted out the dancers' routines over the years included Kevin Carlisle, Anita Mann and Lester Wilson (the choreographer for Saturday Night Fever).

Guest performers and the usage of the Top 10
At times, artists who had a single among the week's Top 10 appeared as guest performers. Often the vocals were lip-synchronized ("lip-synched"). For the live performances, Miller would either record the backing instrumental tracks with his Solid Gold Band or with the artist's band and be sung live on stage at the taping. Arguably one of the more prominent guests to receive this treatment was Joe Cocker, who performed "Up Where We Belong" on Solid Gold several times with Jennifer Warnes, as well as one solo performance of his song "Seven Days." All the duets that Warwick, McCoo, Gibb, or Smith performed with their guest hosts were done live. During the 1986–87 season, the Top 10 was no longer accompanied with dancing from the Solid Gold Dancers but instead was simply listed halfway through the show.

Awards and nominations 
Solid Gold won Robert A. Dickinson three Primetime Emmy Awards for Outstanding Lighting Direction (Electronic) for a Series (two of which were co-won by Frank Olivas). Choreographer Anita Mann was nominated in 1985 and 1986, for Outstanding Choreography.

Episode status
All episodes of Solid Gold exist, including the 1979 pilot. VH1 aired episodes of this series for a brief time, as did The Family Channel in the mid-1990s. Neither CBS Television Distribution (now currently renamed as CBS Media Ventures since 2021), CBS Home Entertainment nor Paramount Home Entertainment, however, had made them available on home video, DVD or Blu-ray as of 2021.

Local syndication listings
About all Cox-owned stations at the time carried Solid Gold when it launched. As previously mentioned, Solid Gold was part of Operation Prime Time, which was more or less a joint between Paramount Television and Cox Broadcasting; Entertainment Tonight was also part of the consortium.

Stations that aired Solid Gold from 1980 to 1988 included:
WUTV-TV 29 in Buffalo, NY
KSHB-TV 41 in Kansas City, MO
WDCA 20 in Washington, D.C.
KMGH-TV 7 in Denver, CO
WCIX 6 in Miami, FL
WFTV 9 in Orlando, FL
WTOG 44 in Tampa, FL
KPHO-TV 5 (later KTSP-TV 10) in Phoenix, AZ
KTVT 11 (later KTXA 21) in Dallas, TX
KHTV 39 (later KTXH 20) in Houston, TX
WPIX 11 in New York, NY
WTAF-TV 29 in Philadelphia, PA
WJZ-TV 13 in Baltimore, MD
WXON 20 in Detroit, MI
KCOP-TV 13 (later KHJ-TV 9) in Los Angeles, CA
KTVU 2 in San Francisco, CA
KTXL 40 in Sacramento, CA
KSTW 11 in Seattle, WA
WBZ-TV 4 in Boston, MA
WFLD 32 in Chicago, IL
The majority of Solid Golds run in Chicago was on WGN-TV 9
WGNX 46 in Atlanta, GA
WUAB 43 in Cleveland, OH
WSYX 6 in Columbus, OH (former callsign WTVN-TV)
KMSP-TV 9 in Minneapolis, MN
KPLR-TV 11 in St. Louis, MO
WTTV 4 in Indianapolis, IN
WVTV 18 in Milwaukee, WI
KPTV 12 in Portland, OR
WIIC/WPXI 11 in Pittsburgh, PA 
KTTU-TV 2 in Fairbanks, AK
WGNO-TV 26 in New Orleans, LA
WBRC-TV 6 in Birmingham, AL
KADN-TV 15 in Lafayette, LA
KFDM 6 in Beaumont, TX
KSAT-TV 12 in San Antonio, TX
WJAR-TV/WJAR 10 at Providence, Rhode Island
WPTZ 5 in Plattsburgh, NY/Burlington, VT
WTVZ 33 in Norfolk, VA

In Canada, Solid Gold was aired on the following stations:
CITV-TV (Global) - Edmonton, AB
NTV (CTV) - St. John's, NF
CITY-TV (CityTV) - Toronto, ON
CFCF-TV (CTV) - Montreal, QC
CKWS-TV (CBC) - Kingston, ON

References

External links
 

1980s American music television series
First-run syndicated television programs in the United States
Television series by CBS Studios
Operation Prime Time
1980 American television series debuts
1988 American television series endings
1980s American variety television series
American music chart television shows
Dance television shows
Pop music television series
Television series created by Al Masini